Sîdîyîk Ibrahim H. Mîrzî (known in Romanian as Sadîc Ibraim) (1909–1959) was a Crimean Tatar spiritual leader, imam, Mufti of the Muslim community of Romania, and activist for ethnic Tatar causes.

Biography 
Sîdîyîk was born in 1909 to Ibrahim Hağî Mîrzî (1881-1960) and Zebide (1888-1968) in Kíşke Tatlîğak, known today as Dulcești, a village situated in the Tatar countryside west of Mangalia.

He served as Mufti of Constanța County between 1943 and 1945. He was preceded by Kurt-Amet Mustafa and succeeded by Reşit Seit-Veli.

In 1945 he was arrested and investigated facing charges of traveling to Crimea sent by the Gestapo to foster the separation of Crimea from the Soviet Union, creating in Romania nests of Crimean Tatars aimed at defaming in the highest degree the Soviet state and its army, helping the Germans to recruit Crimean Tatars charged of being Soviet patriots who were taken to Germany and whose existence is unknown.

Sîdîyîk died in 1959 in Pitești Prison. He was buried at  Muslim Central Cemetery in Constanța, at: 44.173435, 28.621952.

Citations

Sources

See also 
 Islam in Romania
 Crimean Tatars
 List of Crimean Tatars

1909 births
1959 deaths
Muftis of Romania
Crimean Tatar muftis
Crimean Tatar activists
Romanian Muslims
Romanian people of Crimean Tatar descent
People from Constanța
People from Constanța County
Inmates of Pitești prison